Krasnye Vorota:

 Red Gate
 Krasnye Vorota square
 Krasnye Vorota (Moscow Metro)
 Krasnye Vorota (Kazan)
 Krasnye Vorota (Altai Krai)